Shamrock Diaries is the seventh studio album by British singer-songwriter Chris Rea, released in 1985. This album represents the beginning of a creative and commercial zenith for Rea. Shamrock Diaries was a huge seller in Europe, reaching the top 20 in several countries including Ireland, West Germany, Czechoslovakia, Sweden and the United Kingdom, and spent forty two weeks in the Dutch charts, peaking at No. 3. The album was also successful in Australia, where it charted in the top 50. "Stainsby Girls" became Rea's first Top 30 single since 1978's "Fool If You Think It's Over". In 1988, Magnet Records was taken over by Warner Bros Records, who re-released Shamrock Diaries with a significantly remixed version of "Josephine". The original version was used in the 2019 deluxe re-issue of the album.

Composition
Rea wrote the material during a protracted stay in Ireland. In a fresh interview for the sleeve notes in the deluxe version of the album (2019), he recalls how Dublin "reminded me so much of my home town.... Middlesbrough back then was about 65% Irish... And half my family are from Ireland." The two most popular tracks from the album were written for members of Rea's family. "Stainsby Girls" was a tribute to his wife, Joan, a former student of the Stainsby Secondary Modern School. "Josephine" was written for his daughter, after whom it is named. Almost a decade later, Rea would also name a song after his youngest daughter, Julia, on the album Espresso Logic (1993).

Rea told Q magazine that he wrote "Steel River" after returning to Middlesbrough "to see me father after me mother died, and [they] had knocked the whole place down. I’d been gone three years, hard touring in Europe, I literally went to drive somewhere that wasn't there. It was like a sci-fi movie. That's when I wrote Steel River. The Middlesbrough I knew, it's as if there was a war there 10 years ago." "Chisel Hill" refers to a house Rea bought in the vicinity of Roseberry Topping, which lies just south of Middlesbrough, and has a distinctive half-cone shaped summit. Rea says that the song "can make me cry quite easily... We'd reached the point where we'd bought a house, I had a child, we were happy. We'd kept the wolf from the door and things were okay... [I] wrote that song all in one quick go... whoever wrote that song back then, he must have been a really happy guy. Yeah, that song gets me." "You're looking back at yourself", he said, "remembering what you thought was going to happen, and then what actually happened... I definitely should have stayed in Chisel Hill, without a doubt!"

Cover versions
The track "Stone" was covered by the Law on their self-titled album, with Rea on guitar. In 2000, "Josephine" was sampled by Superfunk for their song "Lucky Star", with Ron Carroll, although the samples come from another (shorter) version of the song, rather than the original album version.

In 2007 German guitarist Axel Rudi Pell covered the same track for his album Diamonds Unlocked. His version features Johnny Gioeli on vocals.

Track listing
All songs by Chris Rea
 "Steel River" – 6:15
 "Stainsby Girls" – 3:51
 "Chisel Hill" – 4:03
 "Josephine" – 4:26 (3:56 in later pressings)
 "One Golden Rule" – 4:29
 "All Summer Long" – 4:09
 "Stone" – 4:23
 "Shamrock Diaries" – 4:55
 "Love Turns to Lies" – 4:11
 "Hired Gun" – 8:03

Certifications

Personnel 
 Chris Rea – lead and backing vocals, organ, synthesizers, guitars, slide guitar
 Kevin Leach – keyboards, grand piano, Rhodes 
 Max Middleton – keyboards, grand piano, Rhodes
 Robert Ahwai – additional rhythm guitar
 Simon Nicol – additional rhythm guitar
 Eoghan O'Neill – bass
 Dave Mattacks – drums
 Adrian Rea – drums
 Martin Ditcham – percussion
 Mel Collins – saxophone
 Annie Whitehead – trombone
 The Sultanas (Ian Barnett, Donnie Hilstad, Jesse Lortz and Kimberly Morrison) – backing vocals

Production 
 Chris Rea – producer
 David Richards – producer, engineer
 Barry Hammond – engineer
 Bil Smith – cover artwork 
 Derek Ridgers – photography 
 Real Life Limited – management

 Studios 
 Recorded at Bray Studios (Bray, England) and Chipping Norton Recording Studios (Oxfordshire, England).
 Mixed at Mountain Studios (Montreux, Switzerland).

Singles
 "Stainsby Girls" b/w "And When She Smiles", "Sunrise", "Dancing Shoes", "September Blue"
 "Josephine" b/w "Josephine (Remix)", "Everytime It Rains"

References

Chris Rea albums
1985 albums
Albums produced by David Richards (record producer)
Magnet Records albums